The 1990 Hi-Tec British Open Championships was held at the Lambs Squash Club with the later stages being held at the Wembley Conference Centre from 16–23 April 1990. Jahangir Khan won his ninth consecutive title defeating Rodney Martin in the final. This ninth success by Khan set a new record beating the previous record held by Australian Geoff Hunt.

Seeds

Draw and results

First round

Second round

Main draw

References

Men's British Open Squash Championships
Men's British Open
Men's British Open Squash Championship
Men's British Open Squash Championship
Men's British Open Squash Championship
Squash competitions in London